is a Japanese actor and singer from Chiba Prefecture. Miyauchi graduated from Nihon University. In 1969, he signed with Toei Company and made his film debut with Nagasaki Blues. He first attracted attention after landing a role in a television series, in Key Hunter on TBS.

He is best known for playing some of the most memorable roles in Tokusatsu history, such as Akira Shinmei/Aoranger in Himitsu Sentai Goranger, Soukichi Banba/Big One in the Sentai series JAKQ Dengekitai, Chief Councillor Naoyuki Miura in Chōriki Sentai Ohranger, Shiro Kazami in Kamen Rider V3 (in which he also sang the opening theme for) and Ken Hayakawa in Kaiketsu Zubat.

Appearances

Film

1969: Nagasaki Blues
1969: Yakuza's Law: Yakuza Keibatsushi: Rinchi as Shikichi
1971: Soshiki Bōryoku Kyodaijingi as Girl Boss's yakuza boyfriend
1971: Gendai poruno-den: Sentensei inpu as Yôichirô / Yuki's boyfriend
1972: Mesubachi no chosen as Eizô Tsuyuki
1972: Mayaku baishun G-Men
1973: Sukeban as Tatsuo Teyogi
1973: Kamen Raidaa Bui Surii tai Desutoron Kaijin as Shiro Kazami "Kamen Rider V3"
1974: Five Riders vs. King Dark as Shirou Kazami "Kamen Rider V3" (voice)
1974: Onna hissatsu ken as Li Mansei
1976: Himitsu Sentai Goranger: The Bomb Hurricane (Short) as Akira Shinmei "Aorenger"
1977: Sugata Sanshiro1977: The War in Space as Morrei
1977: JAKQ Dengekitai vs. Gorenger (Short) as Sokichi Banba "Big One" / Akira Shinmei "Aorenger" (voice only)
1978: The Fall of Ako Castle1979: Aftermath of Battles Without Honor and Humanity1979: Sanada Yukimura no Bōryaku as Chosogabe Morichika
1981: Kamen Rider Super-1: The Movie as Shirou Kazami "Kamen Rider V3" (voice only) 
1982: To Trap a Kidnapper1984: Fireflies in the North1984: Shura no mure1987: Tokyo Blackout1993: Za kakuto oh as Mr. Oshiro
1995: Tokyo Mafia as Hanada
1995: Chouriki Sentai Ohranger: The Movie (1995) as Chief Councillor Naoyuki Miura
1996: Tokyo Mafia 2 as Hanada
1996: Makai tenshô: mado-hen as Musashi Miyamoto
1999: Makai tenshô: The Armageddon as Musashi Miyamoto
2005: Kamen Rider: The First as Tobei Tachibana
2009: Chikashitsu2011: OOO, Den-O, All Riders: Let's Go Kamen Riders as Shirou Kazami/Kamen Rider V3, Ken Hayakawa/Zubat (both voice only)
2011: Gokaiger Goseiger Super Sentai 199 Hero Great Battle as Soukichi Banba/Big One, Akira Shinmei/Aorenger (Voice Only)
2012: Till the Death Do Us Apart Part I2012: Till the Death Do Us Apart Part II2012: Happiness in a Little PlaceDirect-to-video moviesChouriki Sentai Ohranger: Ole vs Kakuranger (1996) as Chief Councillor Naoyuki MiuraGekisou Sentai Carranger vs. Ohranger (1997) as Chief Councillor Naoyuki MiuraHyakujuu Sentai Gaoranger vs. Super Sentai (2001) as Soukichi Banba / Big One

Television
1968: Key Hunter as Shunsuke Dan
1971: Keiji Kun1973: Kamen Rider V3 (regular) as Shirou Kazami "Kamen Rider V3"
1974: Kamen Rider X (eps. 27, 28, 33 & 34) as Shirou Kazami "Kamen Rider V3"
1974: Tasukenin Hashiru as Shimagaeri no Ryu
1975: Himitsu Sentai Gorenger (regular) as Akira Shinmei "AoRanger"
1975: Kamen Rider Stronger (eps. 35, 37 and 39) as Shirou Kazami "Kamen Rider V3"
1976: All Together! Seven Kamen Riders!! (TV special) as Shirou Kazami "Kamen Rider V3"
1977: JAKQ Dengeki Tai (eps. 23-35) as Soukichi Banba "Big One"
1977: Kaiketsu Zubat (regular) as Ken Hayakawa "Zubat"
1978: Spider-man (eps. 31 & 39) as Narcotics Officer Go Tachibana
1978: Abarenbo Shogun as Sukehachi
1979: G-Men '75 as Kazuhiko Shimaya
1979: The Yagyu Conspiracy (ep. 39)
1980: Kamen Rider Skyrider (eps. 23 (Voice Only), 34 & 35) as Shirou Kazami "Kamen Rider V3"
1982: Uchuu Keiji Gavan (eps. 30 & 31) as Space Sheriff Alan
1984: Birth of the 10th! Kamen Riders All Together!! (TV special) as Shirou Kazami "Kamen Rider V3"
1990: Tokkei Winspector (regular) as Head of Department Shunsuke Masaki
1991: Tokkyuu Shirei Solbrain (regular) as Head of Department Shunsuke Masaki
1992: Tokusou Exceedraft (eps. 47-49) as Police Official Shunsuke Masaki
1995: Chouriki Sentai Ohranger (regular) as Chief Councillor Naoyuki Miura
2019: Tokusatsu GaGaGa'' (cameo in ep. 7) as Book store owner

Song
Fight! Masked Rider V3 Kamen Rider V3
Horizon Of Two Men Kaiketsu Zubat
Spark The Fire In Your Eyes! Tokkei Winspector
Moyase Hitomi wo! Tokkei Winspector

Name
Although they have the name pronounced in the same way, the actor Hiroshi Miyauchi (宮内 洋) isn't the videogame musician Hiroshi Miyauchi (宮内博史), from Sega SST Band.

References

Japanese male actors
Actors from Chiba Prefecture
1947 births
Living people
Kamen Rider